Te Rangihaeata ( 1780s – 18 November 1855), was a Ngāti Toa chief, nephew of Te Rauparaha. He had a leading part in the Wairau Affray and the Hutt Valley Campaign.

Early life
A member of the Ngāti Toa, he was born at Kawhia around 1780. His father Te Rakaherea was a war leader of his people and died at the Battle of Hingakaka fighting the Waikato and Ngāti Maniapoto iwi. His mother was the elder sister of Te Rauparaha and an important ariki in her own right. Te Rangihaeata grew up in Te Rauparaha's shadow and became his trusted ally. Te Rauparaha was the strategist and negotiator while Te Rangihaeata tended to be the active warrior, and they were effective in conquering the various Maori iwi and hapu who lived in the modern Wellington and Nelson/Marlborough regions.

Musket wars
Te Rangihaeata rose to prominence during the period of intertribal fighting now known as the Musket Wars.  In 1819 while returning from a raid in the Cook Strait area the Ngāti Toa clashed with the Ngāti Apa around Turakina, near Bulls.  During the subsequent fighting Te Rangihaeata captured and then married the chief's daughter.   This was the beginning of a long-term association between the two tribes, fortunately, as the Ngāti Toa were soon forced to return the area.

Arriving back in their own tribal territories the war party found that the Waikato and Ngāti Maniapoto Māori had decided the Ngāti Toa were undesirable neighbours and for a long time a state of war existed between them.   Although greatly outnumbered and outgunned, Te Rangihaeata conducted a successful defence until Te Rauparaha was able to use his diplomatic skills to extricate the tribe. This was the beginning of their migration down to the Paraparaumu and Kapiti Coast area.  They subsequently conquered most of that region and the upper parts of the South Island, occupying and claiming ownership of the land by right of conquest.

This forcible change of ownership was to be a source of much confusion and conflict when the Pākehā settlers arrived and began buying land.  There were often at least two sets of putative owners, and the ones who felt they had been dispossessed were often more than willing to sell land they owned but could not occupy.

Te Rangihaeata was not initially anti-Pākehā. He encouraged the whalers and the traders and was prepared to tolerate the missionaries.  He valued them for the technology they introduced and the trade goods they were offering. But he quickly recognised that permanent settlers were a different matter, posing a serious threat to the Māori and their traditional ways. Despite that he tried to avoid open conflict.

The Wairau

When in 1843 Arthur Wakefield and the Nelson settlers were claiming the Wairau Valley, chiefs Te Rauparaha and Te Rangihaeata visited Nelson and made their position very clear. Te Rangihaeata promised that he would kill any settlers who tried to take his land from him. Despite this they were prepared to follow the Pākehā legal procedures and await the decision of the Land Commissioner, William Spain. It was the Nelson settlers who jumped the gun and sent surveyors to the disputed land.   Te Rangihaeata had his men firmly but nonviolently remove them, being scrupulously careful to return to them all their surveying equipment and personal possessions, but burning their thatch huts.

The Nelson settlers sent out a party to arrest the two chiefs on a charge of arson. The accidental discharge of a musket precipitated a brief battle, and about a dozen of the settlers were shot. The rest either fled or surrendered to the Māori. Among those captured were Arthur Wakefield and Henry Thompson, the two leaders of the arresting party. Several Māori had been killed, including Te Rongo, one of Te Rangihaeata's wives who was also Te Rauparaha's daughter. The captured settlers were promptly executed in accordance with Māori law and custom.   However it was Te Rangihaeata who insisted on it.

This incident became known as the Wairau Affray. The subsequent Government enquiry exonerated the Māori and decided that the settlers had acted illegally.

The Hutt Valley

A similar situation arose about three years later in the Hutt Valley near Wellington. The settlers were pushing forward aggressively and occupying land that had disputed ownership. Several years of active immigration and the arrival of British Imperial Troops had put the settlers in a much stronger position and much less inclined to tolerate either Māori claims or legal challenges to their occupation of the land.

Once again Te Rangihaeata became involved in the resistance, destroying the farms and the possessions of the settlers on disputed land, but not injuring anyone. However, the settlers did not recognise the warning and very soon open warfare broke out: the Hutt Valley Campaign.

Had the Māori been united, the subsequent history of New Zealand could have been different. Te Rangihaeata fought the British to a stalemate until the British were able to mobilise the Te Atiawa and other iwi to oppose him. Additionally, the abduction and dubious arrest of Te Rauparaha did a lot to discourage the Ngāti Toa. They built a strong pā near Porirua and successfully withstood a British attack. They then retreated to swamps of Poroutawhao, out of reach of the government, and the war was over.

Later life

Te Rangihaeata remained at Poroutawhao until his death from measles on 18 November 1855. There are conflicting stories about this period, that he fiercely resisted any Pākehā penetration into the area and, alternatively, that he made his peace with Governor Grey. In his old age he took charge of the government funded construction of roads in his rohe.

Legacy 
The Transmission Gully Motorway, opened in March 2022 is officially named Te Ara Nui o Te Rangihaeata / The Great Path of Te Rangihaeata in honour of Te Rangihaeata.

References

External links

1780s births
1855 deaths
People from Waikato
Deaths from measles
Infectious disease deaths in New Zealand
Military leaders of the New Zealand Wars
Musket Wars
Ngāti Toa people
Māori tribal leaders
New Zealand Māori men